Shan Lloyd (née Shan Davies) (1 July 1953 – 13 December 2008) was a British journalist, writer and reporter. She was the fourth wife and widow of actor Hugh Lloyd.

Biography
She grew up in Sheen in London, the second daughter of Margaret and Jack Davies, a bank manager. She attended the Richmond County School for Girls; wanting to be a journalist, she left school at 16 in order to train in shorthand and typing at the Anne Godden Secretarial College in Putney, where her mother was a teacher. These new skills obtained her an apprenticeship at the Kilburn Times. Having done work for the Sunday Mirror as a freelancer, Shan Davies, as she then was, started work at the Sunday People in 1976, eventually becoming Fleet Street's first female crime correspondent.

She met Hugh Lloyd in 1978, at Allen's, a famous restaurant in London's West End, while he was performing in No Sex Please, We're British. Hugh Lloyd was already dining there when his friend waved to Shan Lloyd as she was entering the restaurant. The two soon realized that they lived around the corner from one another. Hugh Lloyd, who was in his fifties at the time of their first meeting, had already been married and divorced three times by this time. In his autobiography, Hugh Lloyd described his future wife as "a scatty, blondehaired Fleet Street tabloid journalist". Hugh and Shan married in 1983. They moved to Worthing, West Sussex, in 2003.

Lloyd continued to pursue a professional career as a freelance showbiz reporter for the Brighton and Hove Leader. In her later years, Lloyd became an active member of the Red Hat Society.

Lloyd died on 13 December 2008 at Worthing Hospital, 5 months after the death of her husband. She was 55.

References 

1953 births
2008 deaths
British reporters and correspondents
English journalists
British women journalists
People from Worthing
The Sunday People people